Bruce Egloff (Born April 10, 1965) is a former professional baseball pitcher in the late 1980s and early 1990s. He played at East High School (Denver), Merced Junior College, and UC-Santa Barbara, and was drafted by the Cleveland Indians in 1986.  Egloff pitched mostly in the minor leagues and he struggled with injuries throughout his career, including a three-times-torn rotator cuff and a broken right hand. He missed the entire 1992 regular baseball season while recovering from surgery to fuse two of his cervical vertebrae.

After 1992, he appeared in the California Angels minor league system but retired at the end of the 1993 season rather than undergo further surgery to prolong his playing career.

Egloff later worked as a minor-league pitching coach in the Detroit Tigers organization.

Notes

External links

1965 births
Living people
American expatriate baseball players in Canada
Arizona League Angels players
Baseball players from Denver
Batavia Trojans players
Canton-Akron Indians players
Cleveland Indians players
Colorado Springs Sky Sox players
UC Santa Barbara Gauchos baseball players
Vancouver Canadians players
Waterloo Indians players
Watertown Indians players